The Internet Security Research Group (ISRG) is a Californian public-benefit corporation which focuses on Internet security.

Let's Encrypt—its first major initiative—aims to make Transport Layer Security (TLS) certificates available for free in an automated fashion.

Josh Aas serves as the group's executive director.

Board members 
 Josh Aas (Internet Security Research Group) — ISRG Executive Director
 J. Alex Halderman (University of Michigan)
 Vicky Chin (Mozilla)
 Aanchal Gupta (Independent)
 Jennifer Granick (ACLU)
 Pascal Jaillon (OVH)
 Richard Barnes (Cisco Systems)
 Christine Runnegar (Internet Society)
 Erica Portnoy (Electronic Frontier Foundation)
 David Nalley (Amazon)

References

External links 

 Seth Schoen's Libre Planet 2015 lecture on Let's Encrypt

Internet security
Secure communication
Charities based in California
Digital rights organizations
Internet privacy organizations
Internet-related activism
Organizations based in San Francisco
Organizations established in 2013
Politics and technology
Privacy in the United States
Privacy organizations